Robert Belgrade is a multi-instrumentalist, composer, music educator and narrator, best known as the original English dubbing voice acting for Alucard in Castlevania: Symphony of the Night and as the announcer in several entries of the Tekken series.

Education
Belgrade began his studies in Western classical music on the piano, trumpet and flute. After that he studied the saxophone and improvisation under John Handy. He also studied vocal music under Ali Akbar Khan and tabla under Alla Rakha, Zakir Hussain and Swapan Chaudhuri. He currently resides in Tokyo, Japan and performs in a wide range of musical genres, including R&B, jazz, Latin and Indian music.

Voice acting
Belgrade worked regularly as a voice actor in video games from 1994 to 2007, with notable roles being Alucard in Castlevania: Symphony of the Night and  the Announcer in Tekken.

After some time away to focus on his music career and family he returned to voice over work with the role of Orlok Dracule in Koji Igarashi's Bloodstained: Ritual of the Night.

Filmography

Video games

References

External links
 
 https://www.belgrademusic.com/
 https://tatopani.bandcamp.com/

20th-century American composers
20th-century American male actors
20th-century American male musicians
21st-century American composers
21st-century American male actors
21st-century American male musicians
American male composers
American male video game actors
American male voice actors
American multi-instrumentalists
American music educators
Living people
Male actors from San Francisco
Musicians from San Rafael, California
Year of birth missing (living people)